The Dell 1764 is a laptop computer designed by Dell. At the time of its introduction, it was noted for a fast processor and good sound, a medium hard disk drive and a release price of 679 USD.

Technical overview

CPU 
Intel Core i3-330M (2.13 GHz) or i5-430M (2.26 GHz).

Video cards 
ATI Mobility Radeon HD 5450/4330

Display 
The screen is a high-glossy display and measures 17.3 inches diagonally, and has a resolution of 1600x900 pixels. HDMI and VGA video outputs also are available.

Storage 
The standard internal hard drive size is 500 GB. It also includes an SD card slot, supporting MMC, SD and SDHC cards for additional storage as a standard features of this laptop series.

Other devices 
This laptop includes webcam and Bluetooth adapter.

Colors and configurations
The Dell 1764 is available in different colors and configurations. Colors include black, blue and pink. The configurations may differ in the presence of advanced display adapter, this is available by the laptop configuration.
The new model 1764 is an upgrade of the basic 1750 design, with modified touchpad and improved styling.

Problems with preinstalled software 
Some users noticed a problem with preinstalled software.

Operating Systems
The Dell 1764 is shipped with Windows 7 Operating System. Linux was reported to run well with the Laptop's hardware, but requires proprietary Broadcom drivers for the  wireless network interface card when using some kernels where the integrated open source drivers fail, and if using a version with an upgraded graphics card, requires a proprietary ATI driver.

See also
 Dell Inspiron

References

External links
Dell 1764 Reviews and Specification

Dell laptops